Rosea  may refer to:
 a Latin adjective meaning rose, rosy or pink
 a synonym for Rhosus, a Roman Catholic titular see
 a hamlet of the municipality of Brunello, Italy
 a character in the Valkyrie Profile: Covenant of the Plume videogame

Scientific names
 Rosea, a former genus of the family Rubiaceae and now synonymized with Tricalysia
 Pityriasis rosea, an acute, self-limiting skin eruption

Varieties 
 Cattleya elongata var. rosea, a variety of Cattleya elongata, an orchid species found in Brazil
 Cattleya lawrenceana var. rosea-superba, a variety of labiate Cattleya orchid
 Dactylorhiza aristata f. rosea, a species of orchid
 Margarella antipoda rosea, a subspecies of marine gastropod mollusc in the family Trochidae, the top shells
 Miltonia spectabilis var. rosea
 a variety of Albizia julibrissin
 a variety of Eucalyptus leucoxylon

See also
 Roseus (disambiguation)
 roseum (disambiguation)